Leslie Halward (1905–1976) was a British writer best known for his short stories and plays.

Born in Selly Oak, Birmingham, his autobiography covering the time from his childhood to settling down to married life as a writer in the small village of Guarlford, Let Me Tell You, was published by Michael Joseph Ltd in 1938.

After wartime service during the Second World War at RAF Defford, he turned to BBC radio dramas and wrote a number of plays reflecting working class life of his era.
His other books include To Tea on Sunday (1936), Money's Alright (1938), and Gus and Ida (1939). Halward died in Worcester, England.

References

1905 births
1976 deaths
English radio writers
English short story writers
20th-century English novelists
20th-century British short story writers